Antbear or ant bear may refer to:

 Aardvark, an animal of Africa
 Giant anteater, an animal of South America
Pangolin, an animal of Africa and south Asia

Animal common name disambiguation pages